Pouteria pachycalyx is a species of plant in the family Sapotaceae. It is endemic to Brazil.

References

Flora of Brazil
pachycalyx
Critically endangered plants
Taxonomy articles created by Polbot